The Javid Nama, or Book of Eternity, is a Persian book of poetry written by Muhammad Iqbal and published in 1932. It is considered to be one of the masterpieces of Iqbal. It is inspired by Dante Alighieri's Divine Comedy, and just as Dante's guide was Virgil, Iqbal is guided by Maulana Rumi. Both of them visit different spheres in the heavens coming across different people. Iqbal uses the pseudonym Zinda Rud for himself in this book.

It was translated into English by Arthur John Arberry and into German as Dschavidnma: Das Buch der Ewigkeit by Annemarie Schimmel and in Italian as Il poema Celeste by Alessandro Bausani. Schimmel also prepared a Turkish translation, Cevidname, based on her German edition.

Introduction 

"Man, in this world of seven hues, lute-like is ever afire with lamentation; yearning for a kindred spirit burns him inwardly", Iqbal opens. 

As he prays, he begins reciting Rumi's Persian verses in which Rumi is pleading his Shaykh to reveals a true Human Being to him. As Iqbal finishes these verses, Rumi appears to him. Iqbal now depicts himself as Zinda Rud (a stream, full of life) guided by Rumi the master, through various heavens and spheres and has the honour of approaching Divinity and coming in contact with divine illuminations and historical figures including Jamāl al-Dīn al-Afghānī, Said Halim Pasha, Mansur al-Hallaj, Mirza Ghalib and Nietzsche. 

Several problems of life are discussed and philosophical answers are provided to them. It is an exceedingly enlivening study. Iqbal heavily criticized figures in Indian history such as Mir Jafar from Bengal and Mir Sadiq from the Deccan, who were instrumental in the defeat and death of Nawab Siraj-Ud-Daulah of Bengal and Tipu Sultan of Mysore respectively by betraying them to the East India Company, leading to India to fall under colonial rule. At the end, by addressing his son Javid Iqbal, he speaks to the young people at large and provides guidance to the "new generation."

Contents 

Prayer
Prelude in Heaven
On the first day of creation Heaven rebukes Earth
Song of the Angels
Prelude on Earth
The Spirit of Rumi appears and explains the mystery of the Ascension
Zarvan: the Spirit of Time and Space, conducts the Traveler on his journey to the Supernatural World
Chant of the Stars
The Sphere of the Moon
An Indian ascetic, known to the people of India as Jahan-Dost
Nine sayings of the Indian sage
Epiphany of Sarosh
The Song of Sarosh
Departure for the Valley of Yarghamid, called by the Angels the Valley of Tawasin
Tasin Of Gautama
Tasin Of Zoroaster
Tasin Of Christ
Tasin Of Muhammad
The Sphere of Mercury
Visitation to the Spirits of Jamal al-Din al-Afghani and Sa'id Halim Pasha
Religion and Country
Communism and Capitalism
East and West
The Foundations Of The Koranic World
Man, God’s Vicegerent
Divine Government
The Earth Is The Lord's
Wisdom Is A Great Good
Afghani's Message to the Russian People
The Song Of Zinda-Rud
The Sphere of Venus
The assembly of the gods of the ancient peoples
Song of Baal
We plunge into the Sea of Venus and behold the spirits of Pharaoh and Kitchener
The Sudanese Dervish appear

The Sphere of Mars
The Martians
The Martian astronomer comes out of the observatory
Tour of the city of Marghadin
The Martian damsel who claimed to be a prophetess
Admonition of the Martian Prophetess
The Sphere of Jupiter
The noble spirits of Hallaj, Ghalib, and Qurrat al-Ain Tahira who disdained to dwell in Paradise, preferring to wander for ever
The Song of Hallaj
The Song of Ghalib
The Song of Tahira
Zinda-Rud propounds his problems to the great spirits
Iblis, Leader of the People of Separation, appears
Satan’s Lament
The Sphere of Saturn
The vile spirits which have betrayed the nation and have been rejected by Hell
The Sea of Blood
The Spirit of India appears
The Spirit of India laments
The lament of one of the skiff-riders of the Sea of Blood
Beyond the Spheres
The station of the German philosopher Nietzsche
Departure for the Garden of Paradise
The Palace of Sharaf al-Nisa
Visitation to His Highness Mir Sayyid Ali Hamadani and Mulla Tahir Ghani of Kashmir
In the presence of Shah-i Hamadan
Meeting with the Indian poet Bartari-Hari
Departure to the palace of the kings of the East, Nadir, Abdali, the Martyr - King
The spirit of Nasir-i Khusrau Alavi appears, sings an impassioned ghazal, and vanishes
Message of the Martyr-King to the River Cauvery
Zinda-Rud departs from Paradise: the Houris’ request
Ghazal of Zinda-Rud
The Divine Presence

See also 
 Index of Muhammad Iqbal–related articles
 Payam-i-Mashriq
 Zabur-i-Ajam
 Pas Chih Bayad Kard ay Aqwam-i-Sharq
 Bang-e-Dara
 Bal-e-Jibril
 Asrar-i-Khudi
 Rumuz-e-Bekhudi
 Zarb-i-Kalim
 Armaghan-i-Hijaz

Notes

External links
Read online

Related Websites
 Official Website of Allama Iqbal
 Iqbal Cyber Library, Online Library
 The collection of Urdu poems: Columbia University
 Encyclopedia Britannica.
 Allama Iqbal Urdu Poetry Collection
 Allama Iqbal Searchable Books (iqbal.wiki)
 
 
 E-Books of Allama Iqbal on Rekhta
Social Media Pages
 Facebook Page of Allama Iqbal
 Twitter Account of Allama Iqbal
YouTube Channel
 YouTube Channel of Allama Iqbal

1932 poetry books
Persian poems
Islamic philosophical poetry books
Poetry by Muhammad Iqbal
Poetry collections
Books by Muhammad Iqbal
Persian-language books